"Thank You 4 Every Day Every Body" is a song by Ami Suzuki, released as her eleventh single under Sony Music Japan.

Information
It was the first and only single from Ami's third studio album, Infinity Eighteen Vol.2, and debuted at number one on the singles charts from Oricon. It contains a B-side plus two remixes. The song was used as the main theme in a Kodak TV commercial called "Snap Kids", and the B-side, titled "I really wanna tell", was used in a Kanebo TV commercial called "Professional Style Shampoo".

After she was blacklisted from the music industry, production and distribution of the single stopped in its entirety.

Track listing
Thank You 4 Every Day Every Body
Produced by Tetsuya Komuro
Mixed by Mike Butler
I Really Wanna Tell
Featuring Cue Zero
Thank You 4 Every Day Every Body (Club Collapse Remix)
Remixed by Mike Butler
Remix Co-Produced by Thorsten Laewe
I Really Wanna Tell (Confession Remix)
Featuring Cue Zero
Remixed by Mike Butler
Remix Co-Produced by Thorsten Laewe

Ami Suzuki songs
2000 singles
Oricon Weekly number-one singles
Songs written by Tetsuya Komuro
2000 songs
Sony Music Entertainment Japan singles